Breton carols are communal sacred songs in the Breton language sung at Masses and pardons in Lower Brittany.

General characteristics 
"The songs are sung communally, in the sense that they have been adopted and sung by the people" and allow the people to express their praise to God in Brittany during religious offerings when the liturgical language of the Catholic church was Latin. Effectively, until the Second Vatican Council (1962-1965), Mass and Vespers were spoken or sung in Latin.

In the abundant discography of traditional Breton carols (In Breton Kantikou), one can cite the albums of :fr:Anne Auffret, Yann-Fañch Kemener, Jean Le Meut, choirs like Kanerien Bro Leon, Kanerion Pleuigner, Mouezh Paotred Breizh, Manécanterie Saint-Joseph de Lannion, Psalette de Tréguier or Chœurs de la Maîtrise de Sainte-Anne d’Auray.

The Second Vatican Council having authorised the celebration of Mass and offerings in vernacular language, new Breton carols had been composed since the 1970s, notably by :fr:Visant Seité and :fr:Roger Abjean (often on the Welsh radio), :fr:Job an Irien and :fr:Michel Scouarnec. A certain number had been published under the title of Hag e paro an heol by :fr:Bleun-Brug then :fr:Minihi Levenez. One can also cite more recently the creations of the choir Allah's Kanañ.

Some Breton songs have seen some success outside of Brittany, and have been used to accompany the French lyrics of carols. For example, the carol La nuit qu’il fut livré le Seigneur prit du pain (C3), in which the melody is the same as Lavaromp ar chapeled stouet war an douar, as is also the case in Le pain que tu nous donnes (D83) (Gwerz ar vezventi), O viens, sagesse éternelle (E35) (O êlez ar baradoz), En toi Seigneur mon espérance (G7) (Me ho salud, korf va Zalver), Quand je viens vers toi (G 41) (Karomp Doue da genta), O Croix dressée sur le monde (H 30) (Me a laka va fizians), Jésus qui vit aux cieux (J10) (Kantik ar baradoz), Ami que Dieu appelle (S48) (Patronez dous ar Folgoad), Vous attendiez la promesse (E25) and Bénie sois-tu, sainte Église (K27) (Rouanez ar arvor), Seigneur, seul maître du monde (B24) (Kinnigom oll ar zakrifis), Seigneur que ta parole (A51) (inspiré de Pe trouz war an douar), Vous êtes sans pareille (V10) (la partition indique Air breton). The carol Seigneur, en ton Église (D36) has also taken one of the two melodies from l’angélus Breton de Noël (Eun arhel a-berz an Aotrou), which is also that of Gwerz Zant Erwan.

There have also been recent composition, with melodies modeled on inspiration from Breton songs Dieu qui nous mets au monde (C128) and Si l’espérance t’a fait marcher (G213) by :fr:Didier Rimaud and :fr:Michel Scouarnec.

One can also note the interest in Breton carols by the composers :fr:Camille Saint-Saëns Trois Rapsodies sur des Cantiques bretons for organ (op. 7, 1857) ; (first and third orchestrated in 1892), :fr:Joseph-Guy Ropartz (Kanaouennou ar Bleun-Brug, Douze cantiques bretons), :fr:Paul Ladmirault (Quelques vieux cantiques bretons, 1906), and :fr:Jean Langlais (Noël breton, Suite armoricaine...).

References

Breton songs
Catholic hymns